11-Deoxycorticosterone (DOC), or simply deoxycorticosterone, also known as 21-hydroxyprogesterone, as well as desoxycortone (INN), deoxycortone, and cortexone, is a steroid hormone produced by the adrenal gland that possesses mineralocorticoid activity and acts as a precursor to aldosterone. It is an active (Na+-retaining) mineralocorticoid. As its names indicate,  can be understood as the 21-hydroxy-variant of progesterone or as the 11-deoxy-variant of corticosterone.

DOCA is the abbreviation for the ester 11-deoxycorticosterone acetate.

Biological activity
DOC is a potent mineralocorticoid but is virtually devoid of glucocorticoid activity. However, 11β-hydroxylation of DOC produces corticosterone and confers glucocorticoid activity, along with 10-fold reduced mineralocorticoid activity. In addition to its mineralocorticoid activity, DOC has been found to possess one-third to one-tenth the potency of progesterone as a progestogen when administered systematically to rabbits. However, it has no such activity when applied directly to the uterine mucosa of mice. The discrepancy may be related to the fact that DOC can be converted into progesterone in vivo.

Biological role
DOC is a precursor molecule for the production of aldosterone. The major pathway for aldosterone production is in the adrenal glomerulosa zone of the adrenal gland. It is not a major secretory hormone. It is produced from progesterone by 21β-hydroxylase and is converted to corticosterone by 11β-hydroxylase. Corticosterone is then converted to aldosterone by aldosterone synthase.

Most of the DOC is secreted by the zona fasciculata of the adrenal cortex which also secretes cortisol, and a small amount by the zona glomerulosa, which secretes aldosterone. DOC stimulates the collecting tubules (the tubules which branch together to feed the bladder)  to continue to excrete potassium in much the same way that aldosterone does but not like aldosterone in the end of the looped tubules (distal). At the same time it is not nearly so rigorous at retaining sodium as aldosterone, more than 20 times less. DOC accounts for only 1% of the sodium retention normally  In addition to its inherent lack of vigor there is an escape mechanism controlled by an unknown non steroid hormone  which overrides DOC's sodium conserving power after a few days just as aldosterone is overridden also. This hormone may be the peptide hormone kallikrein, which is augmented by DOC and suppressed by aldosterone. If sodium becomes very high, DOC also increases urine flow. DOC has about 1/20 of the sodium retaining power of aldosterone, and is said to be as little as one per cent of aldosterone at high water intakes. Since DOC has about 1/5 the potassium excreting power of aldosterone, it probably must have aldosterone's help if the serum potassium content becomes too high. DOC's injections do not cause much additional potassium excretion when sodium intake is low. This is probably because aldosterone is already stimulating potassium outflow. When sodium is low DOC probably would not have to be present, but when sodium rises aldosterone declines considerably, and DOC probably tends to take over.

DOC has a similar feedback with respect to potassium as aldosterone. A rise in serum potassium causes a rise in DOC secretion. However, sodium has little effect, and what effect it does have is direct. Angiotensin (the blood pressure hormone) has little effect on DOC, but DOC causes a rapid fall in renin, and therefore angiotensin I, the precursor of angiotensin II. Therefore, DOC must be indirectly inhibiting aldosterone since aldosterone depends on angiotensin II. Sodium, and therefore blood volume, is difficult to regulate internally. That is, when a large dose of sodium threatens the body with high blood pressure, it cannot be resolved by transferring sodium to the intracellular (inside the cell) space.  The red cells would have been possible, but that would not change the blood volume.  Potassium, on the other hand, can be moved into the large intracellular space, and apparently it is by DOC in rabbits.  Thus, a problem in high blood potassium can be resolved somewhat without jettisoning too much of what is sometimes a dangerously scarce mineral that can not be pumped actively independently from sodium. It is imperative to keep total potassium adequate because a deficiency causes the heart to lose force. Movement of potassium into the cells would intensify the sodium problem somewhat because when potassium moves into the cell, a somewhat smaller amount of sodium moves out. Thus, it is desirable to resolve the blood pressure problem as much as possible by the fall in renin above, therefore avoiding loss of sodium, which was usually in very short supply on the African savannas where human ancestors probably evolved.

The resemblance of the pattern of the electromotive forces produced by DOC in the kidney tubules to normal potassium intake, and the total dissimilarity of their shape as produced by potassium deficient tubules, would tend to support the above view. The above attributes are consistent with a hormone which is relied upon to unload both excess sodium and potassium. DOC's action in augmenting kallikrein, the peptide hormone thought to be the sodium "escape hormone," and aldosterone's action in suppressing it, is also supportive of the above concept.

ACTH has more effect on DOC than it does on aldosterone. This may be to give the immune system control over the electrolyte regulation during diarrhea since during dehydration, aldosterone virtually disappears  even though renin and angiotensin rise high. It is because aldosterone disappears that potassium supplements are very dangerous during dehydration and must not be attempted until at least one hour after rehydration so the hormones can reach the nucleus.

DOC's primary purpose is to regulate electrolytes. However, it has other effects, such as to remove potassium from leucocytes  and muscle, depress glycogen formation  and to stimulate copper containing lysyl oxidase enzyme  and connective tissue,  which attributes may be used by the body to help survive during potassium wasting intestinal diseases.
The greater efficiency of DOC in permitting sodium excretion (or perhaps it should be expressed as inefficiency at retention) must be partly through morphological changes in the kidney cells because escape from DOC's sodium retention takes several days to materialize, and when it does, these cells are much more efficient at unloading sodium if sodium is then added than cells accustomed to a prior low intake. Thus, paradoxically, a low salt intake should be protective against loss of sodium in perspiration.

Progesterone prevents some of the loss of potassium by DOC.

Additional images

See also 
 11-Deoxycortisol
 17α-Hydroxyprogesterone
 Corticosterone
 Congenital adrenal hyperplasia

References

Sources

 
 
 
 
 
 
 
 
 
 
 
 
 
 
 
 
 
 
 
 
 
 
 
 
 
 

Glycine receptor antagonists
Mineralocorticoids
Pregnanes
Progestogens
Steroid hormones